Casimiro Castillo   is a town and municipality, in Jalisco in central-western Mexico. The municipality covers an area of 455.13  km².

As of 2005, the municipality had a total population of 18,913.

Five police officers from Casimiro Castillo were arrested for the murder of a young man on August 26, 2020. The body of Alfredo Sevilla, mayor on leave, was found at the bottom of a gully on March 10, 2021.

As of March 11, 2021, the municipality reported 118 cases and 31 deaths related to the COVID-19 pandemic in Mexico.

References

Municipalities of Jalisco